Johann Wilhelm Fück (born  in Frankfurt; died  in Halle) was a German Orientalist.

Starting in 1913, Fück studied classical and Semitic philology at Martin Luther University of Halle-Wittenberg and Goethe University Frankfurt. From 1919 to 1921 he was a member of the German National People's Party.  His promotion took place in 1921 as part of the Orientalist Seminar at Goethe University Frankfurt, where he had lectureships in Hebrew language from 1921 to 1930, and in Arabic philology and Islamic studies from 1935 to 1938. He attained his habilitation in 1929. In the interim from 1930 to 1935, he was a professor at the University of Dhaka, Bangladesh. In 1938 Fück went back to Martin Luther University of Halle-Wittenberg where he remained until his retirement in 1962. In Halle he was also the director of the library of the Deutsche Morgenländische Gesellschaft (German Oriental Society).

Along with Karl Vollers and Régis Blachère, Fück was an important early researcher into the language of the Quran.

Works (select) 

 (Der Fihrist des Ibn an-Nadīm)

External links 
Biography and picture in the Catalogus Professorum Halensis

Notes 

German orientalists
German Arabists
German male non-fiction writers

1894 births

1974 deaths